The Renault GS was a Mid-size car manufactured by Renault from 1920 to 1925.

Details and Evolution
The GS and the similar Renault IG were cars in the 10CV class presented at the Mondial de l'Automobile in Paris in 1919 to replace the Type EF.
Production started In 1920.
In 1922, a new, larger version named the Type II appeared. This version was only produced until 1923.
In 1925 the Renault GS and Renault IG were replaced by the Renault KZ

Types

Characteristics

GS
Cars introduced in 1920